Phước Hưng may refer to several commune-level subdivisions in Vietnam, including:

Phước Hưng, Bà Rịa, a ward of Bà Rịa in Bà Rịa-Vũng Tàu Province
Phước Hưng, An Giang, a commune of An Phú District
Phước Hưng, Long Điền, a commune of Long Điền District in Bà Rịa-Vũng Tàu Province
Phước Hưng, Trà Vinh, a commune of Trà Cú District
Phước Hưng, Bình Định, a commune of Tuy Phước District